This is a list of deputy prime ministers of Barbados.

Deputy premiers of Barbados (1965–1966)

Deputy prime ministers of Barbados (Commonwealth Realm) (1966–2010)

Deputy Prime Ministers of Barbados (Republic) (2022–present)

Timeline

References

See also
Prime Minister of Barbados
Cabinet of Barbados
President of Barbados

Barbados, Deputy Prime Ministers
Politics of Barbados
Deputy Prime Minister